The Engineering Division XCO-6 was an American two-seat observation biplane designed by the United States Army Engineering Division, only two were built and the type did not enter production.

Design and development
Two prototypes of the XCO-6 were built powered by a  inverted air-cooled V-1410 engine. One was tested at McCook Field and subsequently modified but no others were built.

Variants
XCO-6
Prototype two-seat single-engined observation biplane.
XCO-6A
Proposed variant with the main fuel tanks moved into the upper wing, not built.
XCO-6B
A XCO-6 modified with a change of engine to a  Liberty 12A engine.
XCO-6C
XCO-6B modified with a larger propeller and changes to the landing gear.

Specifications (XCO-6)

See also

References

Notes

Bibliography

 
 

1920s United States military reconnaissance aircraft
Cancelled military aircraft projects of the United States